Aegista tokyoensis is a species of air-breathing land snail, a terrestrial pulmonate gastropod mollusk in the family Camaenidae. 

Subspecies: Aegista tokyoensis choshiensis Sakurai & Sorita, 1982

References

 Sorita, E. (1980). A New Species of the Genus Aegista (s. s.) from the Koishikawa Botanical Garden, Tokyo. Venus (Japanese Journal of Malacology). 39(3): 142-147.
 Minato, H. (1988). A systematic and bibliographic list of the Japanese land snails. H. Minato, Shirahama, 294 pp., 7 pls

tokyoensis